Harden Askenasy (3 July 1908 - 19 July 1975) was a Romanian Jewish scientist and professor of neurosurgery, notable for pioneering neurosurgery in Israel and much of the Middle East. He was responsible for making the Israel Neurosurgical Society a member of both the European Neurosurgical Association and the World Federation of Neurosurgical Societies. During his career, he served as a neurosurgeon, researcher, and professor in many areas of science and medicine including anatomy and neurosurgery. His scientific contributions laid the foundation for old and new generations of neurosurgical students who achieved high honors at the top of their profession, both in Israel and abroad.

Early life

Professor Harden M. Askenasy was born in Bucharest, Romania to Mihail Askenasy, a merchant, and Buca née Leibovici, an art teacher. His parents only had one other child, a younger boy named Henry. During his early years, Askenasy was sent to a Christian primary school. Later, he was sent to the Realgymnasium Der Evangelischen Gemeide Zu Bukarest, from which he graduated in 1926.
After graduation, Askenasy continued his education at the University of Montpellier in France. After Montpellier, he attended the University of Paris, where he received his Diplome de Docteur de Medicine in 1934.

Medical training
From 1933 to 1937, Askenasy worked on his neurosurgical residency at the Hospital de la Pitie. He had the luxury of working under the direction of Professor Clovis Vincent, a legendary French neurosurgeon. He had the chance to work amongst many other renowned scientists and physicians during his residency, such as Gerard Guiot, P. Puech, Jean Talairach, Marcel David, and Count Thierry De Martel. All were heralded as neurosurgical leaders throughout France and the world for their scientific contributions. 
The field of neurosurgery began to grow during Askenasy's tenure in France, with many neurologists and neurosurgeons paving the way in the development of surgical practices. During his residency, Askenasy discovered the use of sulphur amides followed by cystic lesion puncture to treat brain abscesses. This therapy avoided the need of an early surgical procedure to remove infected areas of the brain. It was considered the first minimally invasive surgical therapy technique used to treat brain abscesses, replacing the need of craniotomies to treat acute cerebrates. Sulfur amides revolutionized brain abscess therapy, and their use along with modern antibiotics is still being practiced today. Along with Professor Clovis Vincent and Marcel David, Askenasy described the association of brain tumors with psychiatric disease, and the associations of the vascular brain stem lesion with ataxia and astereognosis. 

In 1937 he continued his studies at Johns Hopkins Hospital in Baltimore, USA, with the famed American neurosurgeon Walter Dandy. During the following year, Askenasy had the opportunity to travel around the United States and Canada, visiting and working in some of the most prominent centers for neurosurgery. He even had the opportunity to meet Harvey Cushing, the pioneer and father of American neurosurgery. During his tenure, Askenasy completed additional neurosurgical training as a fellow in the US and Canada at Lahey Clinic with Gilbert Horrax (Boston, MA), Mayo Clinic with Alfred Adson (Rochester, MN), University of Illinois at Chicago with Paul Bucy (Chicago, IL), University of Chicago with Percival Bailey (Chicago, IL), McGill University with Wilder Penfield (Montreal, Quebec, Canada), University of Michigan with Max M. Peet (Ann Arbor, MI), and the University of Pennsylvania with Charles Frazier (Philadelphia, PA). During his training with Walter Dandy, Dr. Askenasy learned trigeminal nerve vascular decompression of the cranial nerve entry zone. It was after his visit with Charles Frazier that he became convinced that the resection of the Gasserian Ganglion was a better technique than vascular decompression.

Professional career
In 1939, Dr. Askenasy arrived in Romania and took a position as a neurosurgeon at the Jewish Hospital in Bucharest. Life soon became very difficult for Askenasy as a Jewish man during World War II. Anti-Semitism, including the infamous Iron Guard, began to take a more sinister form. There was widespread persecution that included dismissing Jews from their jobs, non-hiring of Jews, beatings, and public hanging of Jews. Dr. Askenasy could not escape the atrocities surrounding him.  In 1940, Askenasy became a professor of Anatomy and studied the nervous system at the College for Jewish Students in Bucharest. Not long after, he was exiled to Transnistria on the Ukrainian border, together with hundreds of thousands of Romanian Jews. They were all sent there to die from disease and hunger. While they were in the camp, Askenasy was obligated to clean the extremely dirty community bathroom (latrine), creating a traumatizing memory for him. 

In 1943 he returned to the Neurological Department at the Hospital of the Red Cross in Bucharest because of the need for neurologists. In 1946, after World War II, he returned to his academic endeavors that had been previously interrupted. He decided that it was best for him and his family to go to Palestine, the historic land of the Jewish people. When Jewish citizens were selected to leave Romania on Christmas Eve, his and his wife's names were not called on the list. This was because Dr. Askenasy was a precious asset to the post-war government due to his medical expertise. However, after a meeting with the interior minister of Romania, Teohari Giorgescu, he was granted permission to leave with his wife and family. 

Professor Askenasy departed Bucharest, Romania by boat, the “Pan-York”, where he was able to smuggle his neurosurgical instruments. After departing from Bulgaria, the English Royal Navy diverted the ship to a refugee camp in Famagusta, Cyprus on January 2, 1948. However, the Haganah organization granted him and his wife English immigration certificates under the false names of Mr. Jacob and Mrs. Rivka Schwartz so that they could leave the camp. The Mossad Le’Aliya Bet managed to arrange false documents from allies that helped them to arrive in Haifa, Palestine aboard the “Kedma Haganah Ship” on February 19, 1948. After the Second World War, England had organized chaos in order to destroy all Jewish institutions and promote tension amongst them and the Arab community. Deception, delays, and misinformation were common factors of post-World War II British mandates over Jerusalem. Chaos and inter-religion fighting between the Jewish and Arabs were promoted in other to divide and conquer. British Prime minister Clement Attlee, who was the leader of the Labor Party (1945–1951) can be blamed for the inhumane care of the Jewish inmate concentration camps in Europe, which included food and water blockades and especially blockades for foot entry to Jerusalem. Permit certificate was required to enter into Palestine. Abuse of authority led England to detain members of the Jewish community.

Dr. Askenasy arrived in Israel two years after the departure of the only neurosurgeon at the time, Dr. Henry Wigderson (Montefiore Medical Center, New York). He was heavily recruited at Beilinson Hospital by Dr. Chaim Sheba. Soon after arriving in Palestine, he accepted the offer to work at the hospital on March 24, 1948. For the next 27 years, he would work as a neurosurgeon under the Kupat Holim Clalit health service organization, providing the best modern neurosurgery and all of its sub-specialties relating to brain and spinal cord disorders. The treatments that he provided during the next decade increased as a result of soldiers injured in the war, civilians harmed in auto accidents, and victims injured during Arab terrorist attacks.

In 1950 he became head of the Department of Neurosurgery within Beilinson Hospital's new building, serving as the largest of its kind in Israel. The surplus in head trauma caused an influx of patients in a limited amount of space. Therefore, the Pediatric Department would also host neurosurgical cases when needed. Various articles about the successful Neurosurgery Department were frequently published in Israeli Newspapers. 

In addition to leading the Neurosurgical Department, he also began teaching students in 1950 and officially became a professor of neurosurgery at the Hebrew University of Jerusalem in 1959. Askenasy also became a professor of neurosurgery at Tel Aviv University in 1963. In 1964, he was rewarded as a permanent member of the Tel Aviv University Senate.

Personal life
Professor Harden Askenasy married Nina née Sussmann before departing to Palestine. They remained married for 31 years until his death on July 19, 1975. Together, they gave birth to one child, a daughter named Karin Askenasy-Taub. Karin resides in Israel and is an advocate in establishing and maintaining her father's legacy. She has two children, a daughter named Dana Bensimon, born February 9, 1982, and a son named Tom Harden Mihail Askenasy Taub, born September 8, 1989.  

Professor Harden Askenasy dedicated much of his life to improving the scope of neurosurgery not only in Israel and the Middle East, but also internationally. He often came to the aid of other countries when his medical expertise was needed. Askenasy was also very generous, and even donated his precious neurosurgical instruments to Beilinson Hospital on two different occasions so that the department would be supplied with modern equipment. At that time, Palestine, like many other parts of the world, lacked modern medical instruments. Askenasy worked very hard to save lives during a destructive part of history in Israel, and he committed his practice to improving medical and neurosurgical science.

Legacy
In 1962 Professor Askenasy, together with Professor Ephraim Frei from the Weizmann Institute, developed a magnetic catheter (POD) for intra-arterial endovascular navigation to brain circulation. This approach was an early development for endovascular therapy and treatment of occlusion, cerebral arterial aneurysms, thrombolysis, and arterial venous malformations. 

Professor Askenasy researched the interaction between the 100 watt  laser and brain tissue. This served as an analysis for its use to remove brain tumors. Professor Askenasy also studied the outcome of low level radiation on the development of intracranial meningiomas along the scalp to search for parasites in the heads of Jewish immigrants on their way to Palestine in the early 1920s-1930. It was discovered that application of low level radiation led to epilepsy. He also established a relationship between meningiomas, extrapyramidal disorder, and Parkinson's disease.

The legacy of Professor Askenasy lingers on in the form of new generations of Israeli excellence in medicine and the reputation that Israeli surgeons have gained around the world. To this day, Israeli neurosurgeons are sought after in medical centers across the world as leaders and teachers, thanks to the foundation laid out by Professor Askenasy and many others during his generation. In spite of hardships experienced during the Holocaust, wars, and prevalent anti-Semitism, they rose from the ashes. Professor Askenasy was a neurosurgical pioneer in the Middle East. Along with his predecessors and successors, he provided an everlasting contribution to the fields of cutting-edge science and medicine.

Professor Askenasy also played a major role in the research and development of the following: 	
Minimally invasive therapy for brain abscesses, Endovascular Magnetic Catheter for cerebral artery catheterization, Minimally invasive Trans nasal esphynoidal Stereotactic radioactive Isotope selective implantation (Iridium, Gold, Yttrium); FL-18 Isotope for the detection of brain tumors; INDPTA (intravascular) for the detection of giant aneurysms; Stereotactic Singulectomy for intractable cancer pain; Radioactive Iodine 131 Serum Albumin early detection of cerebral hydrocephalus in mielomeningocele; Sulfonamides early treatment later followed by evacuation of the brain abscess.

References

Romanian neurosurgeons
1908 births
1975 deaths
Israeli neurosurgeons
20th-century surgeons